The 2010 Bergen International Film Festival was arranged in Bergen, Norway 20th-27 October 2010, and was the 11th edition of the festival. It featured over 150 feature films and documentaries, and had an attendance over 45,000, both numbers a new record for the festival.

Important screenings
For the first time, both the opening and the closing film was a Norwegian production.

Opening film
 Home for Christmas, directed by Bent Hamer 

Closing film
 The Troll Hunter, directed by André Øvredal

Films in competition

Cinema Extraordinare - In competition
 The Albanian, directed by Johannes Naber 
 All That I Love, directed by Jacek Borcuch  
 Au Revoir Taipei, directed by Arvin Chen  
 Carancho, directed by Pablo Trapero  
 Dust, directed by Max Jacoby  
 Eastern Drift, directed by Šarūnas Bartas   and 
 Honeymoons, directed by Goran Paskaljević   and 
 The Invisible Eye, directed by Diego Lerman  
 I Saw the Sun, directed by Mahsun Kırmızıgül  
 Le Quattro Volte, directed by Michelangelo Frammatino  
 Life, Above All, directed by Oliver Schmitz  
 Moloch Tropical, directed by Raoul Peck  
 My Joy, directed by Sergei Loznitsa  
 Southern District, directed by Juan Carlos Valdivia  
 Tarda Estate, directed by Antonio Di Trapani an Marco de Angelis

Documentaries - In competition
 The Autobiography of Nicolae Ceausescu, directed by Andrei Ujică  
 Bogota Change, directed by Andreas Møl Dalsgaard 
 Client 9: The Rise and Fall of Eliot Spitzer, directed by Alex Gibney  
 Disco and Atomic War, directed by Jaak Kilmi 
 Dreams in Copenhagen, directed by Max Kestner 
 General Orders no. 9, directed by Robert Persons 
 Human Terrain, directed by James Der Derian, David Udris and Michael Udris 
 Inside Job, directed by Charles H. Ferguson  
 My Perestroika, directed by Robin Hessman 
 Secrets of the Tribe, directed by José Padilha  and 
 Transcendent Man, directed by Barry Ptolemy  
 Waiting for "Superman", directed by Davis Guggenheim  
 World Peace and Other 4th Grade Achievements, directed by Chris Farina

Checkpoints - In competition
The Checkpoints program have existed since 2007, and is a special program focusing on human rights. In 2010, for the first time,  there was declared a winner of the program by a jury led by Iranian Nobel Peace Prize laureate Shirin Ebadi. The prize money, 50,000 NOK, is awarded to the people the documentary portrays and their cause, not the filmmakers.

 Bhutto, directed by Duane Baughman and Johnny O'Hara 
 Bogota Change, directed by Andreas Møl Dalsgaard 
 Budrus, directed by Julia Bacha 
 Enemies of the People, directed by Thet Sambath and Rob Lemkin  and 
 Grace, Milly, Lucy, directed by Raymonde Provencher 
 Hunger, directed by Marcus Vetter and Karin Steinberg 
 Miss Landmine, directed by Stan Feingold 
 There Once was an Island, directed by Briar March 
 War Don Don, directed by Rebecca Richman Cohen 
 Waste Land, directed by Lucy Walker  and 
 World Peace and Other 4th Grade Achievements, directed by Chris Farina

Norwegian Short Film Competition
 1987-1993, directed by Marius Dybwad Brandrud
 Akvarium, directed by Bård Røssevold
 Amor, directed by Thomas Wangsmo
 Fredag, directed by Eirik Svensson
 Jenny, directed by Ingvild Søderlind
 Travelling Fields, directed by Inger Lise Hansen
 Tuba Atlantic, directed by Hallvar Witzø

Scandinavias Best Music Video
This competition program was arranged for the first time in 2010. Music videos from both 2009 and 2010 was eligible, and the videos was nominated by a jury, instead of filmmakers applying for admission, like in the short film program.

 Adiam Dymott - "Miss You", directed by Senay&Kolacz  
 Casiokids - "En vill hest", directed by Kristoffer Borgli  
 Donkeyboy - "Ambitions", directed by Kristoffer Borgli  
 El Perro del Mar - "Change of Heart", directed by Fredrik Nilsson  
 Familjen - "Det var jag", directed by Mats Udd  
 Fever Ray - "If I Had a Heart", directed by Andreas Nilsson  
 Fever Ray - "When I Grow Up", directed by Martin de Thurah  
 Kent - "Idioter", directed by Gustav Johansson 
 Kvelertak - "Mjød", directed by Fredrik S. Hana  
 Lars Vaular - "En eneste", directed by Andrew Amorim  
 Lulu Rouge ft Mikael Sampson - "Bless You", directed by Jimmy Falinski Kornhauser 
 Mew - "Introducing Palace Players", directed by Martin de Thurah 
 Mew - "Repeaterbeater", directed by Martin de Thurah 
 Torgny - "The Only Game", directed by Emil Trier  
 Trentemøller - "Sycamore Feeling", directed by Jesper Just

Awards

Cinema Extraordinare
 Le Quattro Volte, directed by Michelangelo Frammatino

The Audience Award
 World Peace and Other 4th Grade Achievements, directed by Chris Farina

Best Documentary
 The Autobiography of Nicolae Ceausescu, directed by Andrei Ujică

Youth Jury's Documentary Award
 Bogota Change, directed by Andreas Møl Dalsgaard

Checkpoints
 Budrus, directed by Julia Bacha

Best Norwegian Short Film
 Jenny, directed by Ingvild Søderlind

Best Scandinavian Music Video
 Torgny - "The Only Game", directed by Emil Trier

Young Talent Award
 Kedy Hassani

External links
Official site

Bergen International Film Festival, 2010
Bergen International Film Festival
B
B